The São Marcos River (Portuguese, Rio São Marcos) is a river of Goiás state in central Brazil. It is a tributary of the Paranaíba River, which it joins in the reservoir created by Emborcação Dam.

See also
 List of rivers of Goiás
 Tributaries of the Río de la Plata

References

Brazilian Ministry of Transport

Rivers of Goiás